The 2020 Florida Gators football team represented the University of Florida in the 2020 NCAA Division I FBS football season. The Gators played their home games at Ben Hill Griffin Stadium in Gainesville, Florida, and competed in the Eastern Division of the Southeastern Conference (SEC). They were led by third-year head coach Dan Mullen.

Preseason

SEC Media Days
In the preseason media poll, Florida was predicted to win the East Division. Florida received the fourth-most votes to win the SEC Championship Game.

Schedule
Due to the COVID-19 pandemic, the 2020 college football season was postponed, and there was some question if the season would be played at all. On July 31, the Southeastern Conference announced that its teams would play a ten-game conference-only season beginning in late September. Florida's previously scheduled games against non-conference opponents  Eastern Washington, New Mexico State, and South Alabama were all canceled due to the scheduling change, as was the annual rivalry game against Florida State, breaking a streak of annual meetings that began in 1957. Conference games against Texas A&M and Arkansas were added to increase the usual eight-game SEC schedule to ten.

Attendance at all college football games was restricted during the 2020 season due to COVID-19 social distancing considerations. The University of Florida limited home attendance to 20% of capacity at Florida Field. All road games along with the SEC Championship Game and the Cotton Bowl Classic were played with similar attendance caps.

Due to COVID-19 management requirements in response to positive tests and subsequent quarantine of individuals within the Florida program, the Missouri game was moved from October 24 to October 31.
Due to COVID-19 management requirements in response to positive tests and subsequent quarantine of individuals within the Florida program, the LSU game was moved from October 17 to December 12.

Rankings

Game summaries

Ole Miss

South Carolina

Texas A&M

Missouri

For homecoming, the Gators wore throwback uniforms featuring blue helmets and jerseys based on those worn in the mid-1960s.

Georgia

Arkansas

Vanderbilt

Kentucky

Tennessee

LSU

Alabama

Oklahoma

Personnel

Roster

  Redshirt
  Injury

Coaching staff

Players drafted into the NFL

References

Florida
Florida Gators football seasons
Florida Gators football